The Wendler Building is a historic commercial building at 400 D Street in Anchorage, Alaska.  Built in 1915 by Tony and Florence Wendler, it is the oldest commercial building in the city.  The building was listed on the National Register of Historic Places in 1988.

History
Originally located at 4th and I Streets, it was moved to its present location in 1985. It was used by the Wendlers as a store until 1920, after which Florence Wendler converted it to a boarding house.  In 1948, she and her daughters opened Club 25, an exclusive private club for women.  It was eventually opened to general membership, and was for many years a landmark of the city's social scene.

See also 
 National Register of Historic Places listings in Anchorage, Alaska

References

1915 establishments in Alaska
Commercial buildings completed in 1915
Clubhouses on the National Register of Historic Places in Alaska
Buildings and structures on the National Register of Historic Places in Anchorage, Alaska
Relocated buildings and structures in Alaska
Restaurants in Alaska
Retail buildings in Alaska